Mountain Ash General Hospital was a health facility on Duffryn Road, Mountain Ash, Rhondda Cynon Taf, Wales. It was managed by the Cwm Taf Morgannwg University Health Board.

History
The facility has its origins in the Mountain Ash Cottage Hospital which was established in 1910. The current structure was opened by Lord Aberdare as the Mountain Ash and Penrhiwceiber General Hospital in 1924. It joined the National Health Service as Mountain Ash General Hospital in 1948 but, after services transferred to the Ysbyty Cwm Cynon, the general hospital closed in 2012.

References

Hospitals in Rhondda Cynon Taf
Hospitals established in 1910
1910 establishments in Wales
Hospital buildings completed in 1910
Buildings and structures in Rhondda Cynon Taf
Defunct hospitals in Wales